Jesús María Sáenz "Josu" Ortuondo (born 6 November 1951) is a Spanish retired footballer who played as a right winger, and a manager.

Playing career
Born in Ondarroa, Biscay, Basque Country, Ortuondo was an Athletic Bilbao youth graduate. On 14 September 1969, before even having appeared for the reserves, he made his first team – and La Liga – debut, coming on as a second-half substitute for José Argoitia in a 2–0 home win against RCD Mallorca.

Ortuondo scored his first goal in the main category of Spanish football on 5 October 1969, netting his team's second in a 2–3 away loss against FC Barcelona. He would move back to the B-side in the second level for the remainder of the season, which ended in relegation.

After starting the 1970–71 campaign with seven goals in only ten appearances for the B's, Ortuondo was promoted to the main squad in November 1970. Despite being a part of the main squad, he never established as a starter, and left the club in 1973 for CD Logroñés in Tercera División.

In 1974, Ortuondo moved to Segunda División side Real Oviedo, appearing rarely in the club's promotion campaign. He appeared regularly afterwards, as the club suffered two relegations and achieved one promotion in 1979; in that season, he scored a career-best 12 goals.

In 1980, Ortuondo moved abroad and joined Atlético Español FC in Mexico. In 1982, after the club's dissolution, he returned to his home country and subsequently represented CF Lorca Deportiva and Córdoba CF in Segunda División B, retiring with the latter in 1984 at the age of 33.

Coaching career
Immediately after retiring Ortuondo took up coaching, taking over last club Córdoba which was recently relegated to the fourth division. After achieving promotion with the side, he left in 1986 and was subsequently in charge of CP Almería and Linares CF also in the third level.

Ortuondo was named manager of Atlético Madrid's reserves ahead of the 1989–90 season, in the second division. He was dismissed when the club's relegation was confirmed, and spent a year without a club before taking over CF Extremadura in the third tier.

Promoted to the second division in 1994, Ortuondo left Extremadura for CD Badajoz, but was dismissed in May of the following year. He subsequently returned to the Azulgranas, achieving promotion to the top tier but being immediately relegated afterwards.

On 3 July 1998, Ortuondo was appointed in charge of Rayo Vallecano in the second division. He was relieved from his duties the following 9 March, being replaced by Máximo Hernández, but was reinstated as manager six days later.

Ortuondo left Rayo as the club appointed Juande Ramos in charge, remaining unemployed until 11 January 1999, when he was named manager of UD Salamanca in the top tier. In July, he returned to Extremadura for a third spell, with the club in division two.

Ortuondo was relieved from his duties on 7 April 2002, and returned to Córdoba in June. Dismissed the following 20 January, he was appointed in charge of Algeciras CF on 28 November, but was sacked from the latter club in March 2004.

In June 2005, Ortuondo started his fourth period at Extremadura, now in division three. He resigned in January 2007 due to the club's severe financial crisis. In March of the following year, he took the reins of CF Palencia, severely threatened with relegation, but could not avoid the drop.

References

External links

1951 births
Living people
Spanish footballers
Footballers from the Basque Country (autonomous community)
Association football wingers
La Liga players
Segunda División players
Segunda División B players
Tercera División players
Athletic Bilbao footballers
Bilbao Athletic footballers
CD Logroñés footballers
Real Oviedo players
Córdoba CF players
Spanish football managers
La Liga managers
Segunda División managers
Segunda División B managers
Córdoba CF managers
CP Almería managers
Atlético Madrid B managers
Rayo Vallecano managers
CF Extremadura managers
Algeciras CF managers